Peridotite is a dense, coarse-grained igneous rock consisting mostly of the silicate minerals olivine and pyroxene. Peridotite is ultramafic, as the rock contains less than 45% silica. It is high in magnesium (Mg2+), reflecting the high proportions of magnesium-rich olivine, with appreciable iron. Peridotite is derived from Earth's mantle, either as solid blocks and fragments, or as crystals accumulated from magmas that formed in the mantle. The compositions of peridotites from these layered igneous complexes vary widely, reflecting the relative proportions of pyroxenes, chromite, plagioclase, and amphibole.

Peridotite is the dominant rock of the upper part of Earth's mantle. The compositions of peridotite nodules found in certain basalts are of special interest along with diamond pipes (kimberlite), because they provide samples of Earth's mantle brought up from depths ranging from about 30 km to 200 km or more. Some of the nodules preserve isotope ratios of osmium and other elements that record processes that occurred when Earth was formed, and so they are of special interest to paleogeologists because they provide clues to the early composition of Earth's mantle and the complexities of the processes that occurred.

The word peridotite comes from the gemstone peridot, which consists of pale green olivine. Classic peridotite is bright green with some specks of black, although most hand samples tend to be darker green. Peridotitic outcrops typically range from earthy bright yellow to dark green; this is because olivine is easily weathered to iddingsite. While green and yellow are the most common colors, peridotitic rocks may exhibit a wide range of colors including blue, brown, and red.

Classification

Coarse-grained igneous rocks in which mafic minerals (minerals rich in magnesium and iron) make up over 90% of the volume of the rock are classified as ultramafic rocks. Such rocks typically contain less than 45 wt% silica. Ultramafic rocks are further classified by their relative proportions of olivine, orthopyroxene, clinopyroxene, and hornblende, which are the most abundant families of mafic minerals in most ultramafic rocks. Peridotite is then defined as coarse-grained ultramafic rock in which olivine makes up 40% or more of the total volume of these four mineral families in the rock.

Peridotites are further classified as follows:

 Dunite: more than 90% olivine
 Dunite is found as prominent veins in the peridotite layer of ophiolites, which are interpreted as slices of oceanic lithosphere (crust and upper mantle) thrust onto continents. Dunite also occurs as a cumulate in layered intrusions, where olivine crystallized out of a slowly cooling body of magma and accumulated on the floor of the magma body to form the lowest layer of the intrusion. Dunite almost always contains accessory chromite.

Kimberlite: formed in volcanic pipes and at least 35% olivine
 Kimberlite is a highly brecciated variant of peridotite formed in volcanic pipes and is known for being the host rock to diamonds. Unlike other forms of peridotite, kimberlite is quite rare.

 Pyroxene peridotite: From 40% to 90% olivine and less than 5% hornblende
 Harzburgite: less than 5% clinopyroxene
 Harzburgite makes up the bulk of the peridotite layer of ophiolites. It is interpreted as depleted mantle rock, from which basaltic magma has been extracted. It also forms as a cumulate in Type I layered intrusions, forming a layer just above the dunite layer. Harzburgite likely makes up most of the mantle lithosphere underneath continental cratons.
 Wehrlite: less than 5% orthopyroxene
 Wehrlite makes up part of the transition zone between the peridotite layer and overlying gabbro layer of ophiolites.  In  Type II layered intrusions, it takes the place of harzburgite as the layer just above the dunite layer.

 Lherzolite: intermediate content of clinopyroxene and orthopyroxene
 Lherzolite is thought to make up much of the upper mantle. It has almost exactly the composition of a mixture of three parts harzburgite and one part tholeiitic basalt (pyrolite) and is the likely source rock for basaltic magma. It is found as rare xenoliths in basalt, such as those of Kilbourne Hole in southern New Mexico, US, and at Oahu, Hawaii, US.

 Hornblende peridotite: From 40% to 90% olivine and less than 5% pyroxene
 Hornblende peridotite is found as rare xenoliths in andesites above subduction zones. They are direct evidence of alteration of mantle rock by fluids released by the subducting slab.

 Pyroxene hornblende peridotite: Intermediate between pyroxene peridotite and hornblende peridotite
 Pyroxene hornblende peridotite is found as rare xenoliths, such as those of Wilcza Góra in southwest Poland. Here it likely formed by alteration of mantle rock by carbonated hydrous silicic fluids associated with volcanism.

Composition
Mantle peridotite is highly enriched in magnesium, with a typical magnesium number of 89. In other words, of the total content of iron plus magnesium, 89 mol% is magnesium. This is reflected in the composition of the mafic minerals making up the peridotite.

Olivine is the essential mineral found in all peridotites. It is a magnesium orthosilicate containing some iron with the variable formula . The magnesium-rich olivine of peridotites is typically olive-green in color.

Pyroxenes are chain silicates having the variable formula  comprising a large group of different minerals. These are divided into orthopyroxenes (with an orthorhombic crystal structure) and clinopyroxenes (with a monoclinic crystal structure). This distinction is important in the classification of pyroxene peridotites since clinopyroxene melts more easily than orthopyroxene or olivine. The most common orthopyroxene is enstatite, in which iron substitutes for some of the magnesium. The most important clinopyroxene is diopside, again with some substitution of iron for magnesium (hedenbergite). Ultramafic rock in which the fraction of pyroxenes exceeds 60% are classified as pyroxenites rather than peridotites. Pyroxenes are typically dark in color.

Hornblende is an amphibole, a group of minerals resembling pyroxenes but with a double chain structure incorporating water. Hornblende itself has a highly variable composition, ranging from tschermakite to pargasite with many other variations in composition. It is present in peridotite mostly as a consequence of alteration by hydrous fluids.

Although peridotites are classified by their content of olivine, pyroxenes, and hornblende, a number of other mineral families are characteristically present in peridotites and may make up a significant fraction of their composition. For example, chromite is sometimes present in amounts of up to 50%. (A chromite composition above 50% reclassifies the rock as a peridotitic chromitite.) Other common accessory minerals include spinel, garnet, biotite, or magnetite. A peridotite containing significant amounts of one of these minerals may have its classification refined accordingly; for example, if a lhertzolite contains up to 5% spinel, it is a spinel-bearing lhertzolite, while for amounts up to 50%, it would be classified as a spinel lhertzolite. The accessory minerals can be useful for estimating the depth of formation of the peridotite.

Distribution and location

Peridotite is the dominant rock of the Earth's mantle above a depth of about 400 km; below that depth, olivine is converted to the higher-pressure mineral wadsleyite.

Oceanic plates consist of up to about 100 km of peridotite covered by a thin crust. The crust, commonly about 6 km thick, consists of basalt, gabbro, and minor sediments. The peridotite below the ocean crust, "abyssal peridotite," is found on the walls of rifts in the deep sea floor. Oceanic plates are usually subducted back into the mantle in subduction zones. However, pieces can be emplaced into or overthrust on continental crust by a process called obduction, rather than carried down into the mantle. The emplacement may occur during orogenies, as during collisions of one continent with another or with an island arc. The pieces of oceanic plates emplaced within continental crust are referred to as ophiolites. Typical ophiolites consist mostly of peridotite plus associated rocks such as gabbro, pillow basalt, diabase sill-and-dike complexes, and red chert. Alpine peridotite or orogenic peridotite massif is an older term for an ophiolite emplaced in a mountain belt during a continent-continent plate collision.

Peridotites also occur as fragments (xenoliths) carried up by magmas from the mantle. Among the rocks that commonly include peridotite xenoliths are basalt and kimberlite. Although kimberlite is a variant of peridotite, kimberlite is also considered as brecciated volcanic material as well, which is why it is referred to as a source of peridotite xenoliths. Peridotite xenoliths contain osmium and other elements whose stable isotope ratios provide clues on the formation and evolution of the Earth's mantle.

The volcanic equivalent of peridotites are komatiites, which were mostly erupted early in the Earth's history and are rare in rocks younger than Archean in age.

Small pieces of peridotite have been found in lunar breccias.

The rocks of the peridotite family are uncommon at the surface and are highly unstable, because olivine reacts quickly with water at typical temperatures of the upper crust and at the Earth's surface. Many, if not most, surface outcrops have been at least partly altered to serpentinite, a process in which the pyroxenes and olivines are converted to green serpentine. This hydration reaction involves considerable increase in volume with concurrent deformation of the original textures. Serpentinites are mechanically weak and so flow readily within the earth. Distinctive plant communities grow in soils developed on serpentinite, because of the unusual composition of the underlying rock. One mineral in the serpentine group, chrysotile, is a type of asbestos.

Color, morphology, and texture

Most peridotite is green in color due to its high olivine content.  However, peridotites can range in color from greenish-gray to  nearly black to pale yellowish-green. Peridotite weathers to form a distinctive brown crust in subaerial exposures and to a deep orange color in submarine exposures.

Peridotites can take on a massive form or may be in layers on a variety of size scales. Layered peridotites may form the base layers of layered intrusions. These are characterized by cumulate textures, characterized by a fabric of coarse (>5mm) interlocking euhedral (well-formed) crystals in a groundmass of finer crystals formed from liquid magma trapped in the cumulate. Many show poikilitic texture in which crystallization of this liquid has produced crystals that overgrow and enclose the original cumulus crystals (called chadrocrysts).

Another texture is a well-annealed texture of equal sized anhedral crystals with straight grain boundaries intersecting at 120°. This may result when slow cooling allowed recrystallization to minimize surface energy. Cataclastic texture, showing irregular fractures and deformation twinning of olivine grains, is common in peridotites because of the deformation associated with their tectonic mode of emplacement.

Origin
Peridotites have two primary modes of origin: as mantle rocks formed during the accretion and differentiation of the Earth, or as cumulate rocks formed by precipitation of olivine ± pyroxenes from basaltic or ultramafic magmas. These magmas are ultimately derived from the upper mantle by partial melting of mantle peridotites.

Mantle peridotites are sampled as ophiolites in collisional mountain ranges, as xenoliths in basalt or kimberlite, or as abyssal peridotites (sampled from ocean floor). These rocks represent either fertile mantle (lherzolite) or partially depleted mantle (harzburgite, dunite). Alpine peridotites may be either of the ophiolite association and representing the uppermost mantle below ocean basins, or masses of subcontinental mantle emplaced along thrust faults in mountain belts.

Layered peridotites are igneous sediments and form by mechanical accumulation of dense olivine crystals. They form from mantle-derived magmas, such as those of basalt composition. Peridotites associated with Alaskan-type ultramafic complexes are cumulates that probably formed in the root zones of volcanoes. Cumulate peridotites are also formed in komatiite lava flows.

Associated rocks
Komatiites are high temperature partial melts of peridotite characterized by a high degree of partial melting deep below the surface.

Eclogite, a rock similar to basalt in composition, is composed primarily of omphacite (sodic clinopyroxene) and pyrope-rich garnet. Eclogite is associated with peridotite in some xenolith occurrences; it also occurs with peridotite in rocks metamorphosed at high pressures during processes related to subduction.

Economic geology
Peridotite may potentially be used in a low-cost, safe and permanent method of capturing and storing atmospheric CO2 as part of climate change-related greenhouse gas sequestration. It was already known that peridotite reacts with CO2 to form a solid carbonate-like limestone or marble mineral; and this process can be sped up a million times or more by simple drilling and hydraulic fracturing to allow injection of the CO2 into the subsurface peridotite formation.

Peridotite is named for the gemstone peridot, a glassy green gem originally mined on St. John's Island in the Red Sea and now mined on the San Carlos Apache Indian Reservation in Arizona.

Peridotite that has been hydrated at low temperatures is the protolith for serpentinite, which may include chrysotile asbestos (a form of serpentine) and talc.

Layered intrusions with cumulate peridotite are typically associated with sulfide or chromite ores. Sulfides associated with peridotites form nickel ores and platinoid metals; most of the platinum used in the world today is mined from the Bushveld Igneous Complex in South Africa and the Great Dyke of Zimbabwe. The chromite bands found in peridotites are the world's major source of chromium.

References

Further reading
 
 J.-L. Bodinier and M. Godard, 2004, Orogenic, Ophiolitic, and Abyssal Peridotites, in The Mantle and Core (ed. R. W. Carlson), Treatise on Geochemistry v. 2, Elsevier-Pergamon, Oxford

External links

Ultramafic rocks
Plutonic rocks